Carlos Humberto Aceves del Olmo (born 5 November 1940) is a Mexican union leader and politician affiliated with the PRI. He currently serves as Secretary General to CTM (Confederation of Mexican Workers) Union, representing the largest number of Union Workers in Mexico Labor Movement Mexico. He is also the President to de Congreso del Trabajo, organization that represents over 40 Union Organizations. He has been a Federal Congressman  in 3 terms as well as a Senator during the LX and LXI Legislatures.

References

1940 births
Living people
Politicians from Mexico City
Members of the Senate of the Republic (Mexico) for Mexico City
Members of the Chamber of Deputies (Mexico) for Mexico City
Presidents of the Senate of the Republic (Mexico)
Institutional Revolutionary Party politicians
21st-century Mexican politicians
20th-century Mexican politicians
Deputies of the LVIII Legislature of Mexico
Deputies of the LXII Legislature of Mexico
Senators of the LX and LXI Legislatures of Mexico
Senators of the LXIV and LXV Legislatures of Mexico